{{DISPLAYTITLE:C15H12I3NO4}}
The molecular formula C15H12I3NO4 (molar mass: 650.973 g/mol) may refer to:

 Reverse triiodothyronine
 Triiodothyronine

Molecular formulas